Mitrella deforgesi is a species of sea snail, a marine gastropod mollusk in the family Columbellidae, the dove snails.

Description
The length of the shell attains 8.2 millimeters.

Distribution
This marine species occurs off New Caledonia, Indonesia and the Philippines.

References

 Monsecour, K.; Monsecour, D. (2016). Deep-water Columbellidae (Mollusca: Gastropoda) from New Caledonia. in: Héros, V. et al. (Ed.) Tropical Deep-Sea Benthos 29. Mémoires du Muséum national d'Histoire naturelle (1993). 208: 291-362.

External links
 

deforgesi
Gastropods described in 2016